St. Joseph's Boys' College is a distinguished boys only primary to secondary (inclusive) school in the Nugegoda Colombo, Sri Lanka. It was founded in 1953. St Joseph's Boys College is a Roman Catholic school.

Houses 
 Raymond 
 Anthony
 Cooray

Past principals 

The first principal was Miss. Gozmeo Indian. In 1985 the Marist Brothers took over the management of the school.

{| class="wikitable"
|Rev. Bro. Jerad Pieris        
|1985-1989
|-
|Rev. Bro. Gregary Appuhamy     
|1989–1990
|-
|Rev. Bro. Sunanada Alwis        
|1990–1991
|-
|Rev. Bro. Gregary Fonseka
|1991–1995
|-
|Rev. Bro. Lal Fonseka
|1995–2000
|-
|Rev. Bro. Charles Fernando
|2000–2002
|-
|Rev. Bro. Godfrey Perera
|2002–2008
|-
|Rev. Bro. Robert Miranda 
|2008–2009
|-
|Rev. Bro. Joseph Pieris
|2009–2011
|-
|Rev. Bro. Chinthana Nonis 
|2011–2017
|-
|Rev. Bro. Noel Fonseka
|2017–2018
|-
|Rev. Bro. Sunanda Alwis
|2018-2021

See also
List of Marist Brothers schools

External links
Official
St.Joseph's Boys' College, Nugegoda

Alumni
Old Boy’s Association of St Joseph’s College Nugegoda

Catholic schools in Sri Lanka
Catholic secondary schools in Sri Lanka
Schools in Colombo District
Boys' schools in Sri Lanka
Educational institutions established in 1953
1953 establishments in Ceylon